Pododexia is a genus of parasitic flies in the family Tachinidae.

Species
Pododexia arachna Brauer & von Bergenstamm, 1889
Pododexia hirtipleura Mesnil, 1976
Pododexia similis Mesnil, 1976

References

Dexiinae
Diptera of Africa
Taxa named by Friedrich Moritz Brauer
Taxa named by Julius von Bergenstamm
Tachinidae genera